Saranporn Langkulgasettrin (born: 9 December 1999) is a Thai professional golfer playing on the LPGA of Japan Tour.

Early life 
Saranporn was born on 9 December 1999 in Phuket, Thailand. She started playing golf at the age of 9 years old.

Professional career 
Saranporn turned professional in 2015 at the age of 15. In 2015, she secured three wins on the All Thailand Golf Tour. In December 2016, she got her first international title at the ICTSI Philippines Ladies Masters on the Taiwan LPGA Tour. She became a member of the China LPGA Tour in the 2017 season by finishing third in the qualifying tournament.

In 2017, she achieved her first win on the China LPGA Tour at the Wuhan Challenge in June. She also claimed two additional wins on the China LPGA Tour, the CLPGA Zhuhai Heritage and the PTT Thailand LPGA Masters. Because of her performance in the 2017 season, Saranporn took the China LPGA Tour Order of Merit winner and Rookie of the Year award, plus an entry to the major championship, U.S. Women's Open.

In 2018, she played eight events on the China LPGA Tour and won two more titles at the Sun Car Zhangjiagang Shuangshan Challenge and EFG Hong Kong Ladies Open. At the U.S. Women's Open, she made the cut and finished in the 59th place. She won the China LPGA Tour Order of Merit for the second consecutive year.

In 2019, she played in the LPGA of Japan Tour and got her first win in Japan at the Nipponham Ladies Classic.

Professional wins (16)

LPGA of Japan Tour wins (1) 
2019 (1) Nipponham Ladies Classic

China LPGA Tour wins (5) 
2017 (3) Wuhan Challenge, CLPGA Zhuhai Heritage, PTT Thailand LPGA Masters^
2018 (2) Sun Car Zhangjiagang Shuangshan Challenge, EFG Hong Kong Ladies Open†
^ Co-sanctioned by the ALPG Tour and Thai LPGA Tour.
† Co-sanctioned by the Taiwan LPGA Tour and Ladies Asian Golf Tour.

Taiwan LPGA Tour wins (3) 
2016 (1) ICTSI Philippines Ladies Masters
2017 (1) Kenda Tires TLPGA Open
2018 (1) EFG Hong Kong Ladies Open^
^ Co-sanctioned by the China LPGA Tour and Ladies Asian Golf Tour.

Thai LPGA Tour wins (2) 
2016 (1)  8th Singha-SAT Thai LPGA Championship
2017 (1) PTT Thailand LPGA Masters^
^ Co-sanctioned by the China LPGA Tour and ALPG Tour.

All Thailand Golf Tour wins (7) 
2015 (2) Singha Open, All Thailand Premier Championship - Road to Singha Masters
2016 (3) Singha Classic, Singha Championship, All Thailand Premier Championship - Road to Singha Masters
2017 (2) Singha Phuket Open, Singha Chiang Mai Open

Results in LPGA majors 
Results not in chronological order.

CUT = missed the half-way cut
"T" = tied

References

External links

Saranporn Langkulgasettrin
LPGA of Japan Tour golfers
Saranporn Langkulgasettrin
1999 births
Living people
Saranporn Langkulgasettrin